Vyazma is a town in Vyazemsky District of Smolensk Oblast, Russia.

Vyazma may also refer to:
Vyazma (river), a river in the Smolensk Oblast in Russia, a left tributary of the Dnieper
Vyazma (inhabited locality), several inhabited localities in Russia
Vyazma Airport, an airport in Smolensk Oblast, Russia

See also
Vyazemsky (disambiguation)
Battle of Vyazma, a part of the 1812 French invasion of Russia
Vyazma pocket, created by the encirclement of Red Army units by the German Army during the advance on Moscow in October 1941